Daniel Taylor (born May 12, 1982) is an American shot putter. He is currently sponsored by Nike. He is currently competing around the world in track and field.

High school
He attended Berkshire High School in Burton, Ohio, and was a letterman in football and track and field. In football, he garnered first team All-North East Ohio honors.

He was much more successful in track and field. In his sophomore year of high school he won the Division III state discus title with a throw of 167' 4". Taylor also holds the OHSAA Division III state discus record at 200' 11".

Taylor's best finish in the shot put in the state championship was 2nd in 1999, during this year Berkshire High School was a Division III school.

His personal best throw is 21.78 metres, achieved in May 2009 in Tucson.

College
Taylor attended Ohio State University. He graduated in 2005 with a B.S. in Agriculture. He majored in Construction Systems Management and minored in molecular microbiology and in City and Regional Planning.
While at Ohio State University, He was a 2 time NCAA Champion, an 11 time NCAA All-American, and a 7 time Big Ten Champion.

Achievements
All results regarding shot put, unless stated otherwise

References

External links
 
 

1982 births
Living people
People from Geauga County, Ohio
American male shot putters
Athletes (track and field) at the 2003 Pan American Games
Pan American Games track and field athletes for the United States